Sunday Mail or The Sunday Mail may refer to:

Newspapers
Sunday Mail (Scotland), Scottish tabloid
The Sunday Mail (Brisbane), Sunday tabloid in Queensland, Australia
The Mail on Sunday, British conservative tabloid
Sunday Mail (Adelaide), Sunday tabloid in Adelaide, South Australia
Sunday Mail, Sunday edition of The Malay Mail; now replaced by Weekend Mail
The Sunday Mail (Zimbabwe), Sunday paper in Harare, Zimbabwe, sister paper to The Herald

Music
"Sunday Mail", a song by Marcy Playground from their 1999 album Shapeshifter
The Sunday Mail, former name of the band Jukebox the Ghost

See also

 
 
 
 Mail on Sunday (album), 2008 album by Flo Rida
 Sunday (disambiguation)
 Mail (disambiguation)